Schley is an unincorporated community in Gloucester County, in the U. S. state of Virginia. Schley has a post office with ZIP code 23154.

References

Unincorporated communities in Virginia
Unincorporated communities in Gloucester County, Virginia